Sodium trifluoromethanesulfinate (CF3SO2Na) is the sodium salt of trifluoromethanesulfinic acid. Together with t-butyl hydroperoxide, an oxidant, this compound was found to be a suitable reagent for introducing trifluoromethyl groups onto electron-rich aromatic compounds by Langlois; this reagent is also known as the Langlois reagent. This reaction operates via a free radical mechanism.

This reagent is also able to trifluoromethylate electron-deficient aromatic compounds under biphasic conditions. Zinc difluoromethanesulfinate, a related polymeric coordination complex, is able to introduce difluoromethyl groups (CHF2-) onto aromatic compounds under similar biphasic conditions as well.

With the use of DMSO as an oxidant, it provides an environmentally friendly way for the synthesis of β-trifluoromethyl alcohols from alkenes.

References

Further reading
 

Sodium compounds
Fluorine compounds
Sulfinates
Reagents for organic chemistry
Trifluoromethyl compounds